Pelmanism may refer to:
 Pelmanism (system), a memory-training and personal development "system" popular in the first half of the twentieth century
 Concentration (game), a memory-based card game also known as Pelmanism